is a Japanese male artistic gymnast, representing his nation at international competitions. He won the gold medal in the Pommel horse event at the 2014 Asian Games in Incheon, South Korea.

References

Living people
Japanese male artistic gymnasts
Gymnasts at the 2014 Asian Games
Asian Games medalists in gymnastics
Asian Games gold medalists for Japan
Asian Games silver medalists for Japan
Asian Games bronze medalists for Japan
Medalists at the 2014 Asian Games
Universiade medalists in gymnastics
Year of birth missing (living people)
Universiade gold medalists for Japan
Medalists at the 2011 Summer Universiade
20th-century Japanese people
21st-century Japanese people